The Ottoman Empire had a number of tributary and vassal states throughout its history.  Its tributary states would regularly send tribute to the Ottoman Empire, which was understood by both states as also being a token of submission.  In exchange for certain privileges, its vassal states were obligated to render support to the Ottoman Empire when called upon to do so.  Some of its vassal states were also tributary states.  
These client states, many of which could be described by modern terms such as satellite states or puppet states, were usually on the periphery of the Ottoman Empire under suzerainty of the Porte, over which direct control was not established, for various reasons.

Functions
Ottomans first demanded only a small yearly tribute from vassal princes, as a token of their submission. They later demanded that a vassal prince's son should be held as hostage, that the prince should come to the Palace once a year and swear allegiance, and that he should send auxiliary troops on the sultan's campaigns. Vassal princes were required to treat sultan's friends and enemies as their own. If the vassal failed in these duties, his lands would be declared as darülharb (lit. territory of war) open to the raids of the Ghazis.

Forms
Some states within the eyalet system included sancakbeys who were local to their sanjak or who inherited their position (e.g., Samtskhe, some Kurdish sanjaks), areas that were permitted to elect their own leaders (e.g., areas of Albania, Epirus, and Morea (Mani Peninsula) was nominally a part of Aegean Islands Province but Maniot beys were tributary vassals of the Porte, or de facto independent eyalets (e.g., the Barbaresque 'regencies' Algiers, Tunisia, Tripolitania in the Maghreb, and later the Khedivate of Egypt).
Outside the eyalet system were states such as Moldavia, Wallachia and Transylvania which paid tribute to the Ottomans and over which the Porte had the right to nominate or depose the ruler, garrison rights, and foreign policy control. They were considered by the Ottomans as part of Dar al-'Ahd, thus they were allowed to preserve their self-rule, and were not under Islamic law, like the empire proper; Ottoman subjects, or Muslims for that matter, were not allowed to settle the land permanently or to build mosques.
Some states such as Ragusa paid tribute for the entirety of their territory and recognized Ottoman suzerainty.
Others, such as the Sharif of Mecca, recognized Ottoman suzerainty but were subsidized by the Porte. The Ottomans were also expected to protect the Sharifate militarily – as suzerains over Mecca and Medina, the Ottoman sultans were meant to ensure the protection of the Hajj and Umrah pilgrimages and safe passage of pilgrims. The Amir al-hajj was a military officer appointed by the Sultanate to ensure this. 
During the nineteenth century, as Ottoman territory receded, several breakaway states from the Ottoman Empire had the status of vassal states (e.g. they paid tribute to the Ottoman Empire), before gaining complete independence. They were however de facto independent, including having their own foreign policy and their own independent military. This was the case with the principalities of Serbia, Romania and Bulgaria.
Some states paid tribute for possessions that were legally bound to the Ottoman Empire but not possessed by the Ottomans such as the Habsburgs for parts of Royal Hungary or Venice for Zante.

There were also secondary vassals such as the Nogai Horde and the Circassians who were (at least nominally) vassals of the khans of Crimea, or some Berbers and Arabs who paid tribute to the North African beylerbeyis, who were in turn Ottoman vassals themselves.

List

Byzantine Empire c.1370–1402, c.1421–1453
Despot of Morea (1422-1470)
Trebizond Empire (1456–1461)
Lordship of Prilep (1371–1395)
Dejanović noble family (1371–1395)
Principality of Wallachia (Eflâk Prensliği), 1396–1397, 1417–1861 with some interruptions.
Despotate of Serbia (1402-1459)
Second Bulgarian Empire (14th century)
Principality of Moldavia (Boğdan Prensliği), 1456–1457, 1503–1861 with some interruptions.
Republic of Ragusa (1458–1808)
Sultanate of Malacca, (1459–1477) during the reign of Sultan Mansur Shah.
Crimean Khanate (Kırım Hanlığı), 1478–1774
Budjak Horde (? -1807)
Circassian principalities and tribes
Kabarda (? -1739)
Yedisan (1684-1760s)
Mount Lebanon Emirate
Ma'an (1516–1697)
Chehab (1697–1840)
Sharifate of Mecca, 1517–1803
Funjistan, 1556-1821
Kazan Khanate (Kazan Hanlığı), 1523: Kazan briefly conquered by Crimean Khanate, Sahib I Giray enthroned as Khan
Eastern Hungarian Kingdom (1526–1551, 1556–1570)
Adal Sultanate
Duchy of the Archipelago (1537, 1565–1579)
Sultanate of Tuggurt (1552–1871)
Principality of Montenegro (Karadağ Prensliği), (1696-1878)
Omani Empire (1602-18th century)
Kingdom of Ait Abbas 
Abdalvadidov Kingdom (1554–1556)
Samtskhe-Saatabago (atabegate) (1500–1515)
Wattasid Dynasty (1554) 
Kingdom of Imereti (1555–1804)
Principality of Mingrelia (1557–1803)
Principality of Guria (1614–1810)
Principality of Abkhazia (1555–1810)
Bornu Empire (1603)
Wadai Sultanate
Ethiopia (1541-18th century)
Hilaalee dynasty of The Maldives, 1565?–1737?
Principality of Transylvania (Erdel), 1570–1718 with some interruptions
Swahilli city-states (1583)
Sultanate of Aceh, 1569-1903
Saadi dynasty (1576)
Kingdom of Bohemia, briefly in 1620 under Frederick I of Bohemia
Emirate of Harar (1647–1887)
Cossack Hetmanate: Protectorate and Sanjak of the Ottoman Empire (1655 - 1663) and (June 1669 – 1685)
Principality of Upper Hungary (modern-day Slovakia), 1682–1685 under Imre Thököly
Danubian Sich
 Mamluk of Iraq (1704–1831)
Hotaki dynasty
Sultanate of Darfur (1915)
Septinsular Republic (1800–1807)
Principality of Serbia (Sırbistan Prensliği), 1815–1867; de facto independence 1867; de jure independence 1878
Emirate of Jabal Shammar, 1836–1921
Emirate of Najd
United Principalities of Romania (Romanya Prensliği), 1862–1877
Yettishar (1865-1877)
Khedivate of Egypt (Mısır), 1867–1914: de jure under Ottoman suzerainty, in effect fully autonomous, and from 1882 under British occupation; broke away from Ottoman suzerainty upon Ottoman entry into World War I on the side of the Central Powers and reformed as the "Sultanate of Egypt" which was declared a British protectorate on 5 November 1914, the day when Britain and France declared war against the Ottoman Empire. Britain also formally annexed Cyprus (under British administration since the Cyprus Convention in 1878, but nominally still an Ottoman territory) until 5 November 1914.
Principality of Bulgaria (Bulgaristan Prensliği), 1878–1908: de facto independent.
Principality of Samos (Sisam), 1835–1912: established as an autonomous tributary principality under a Christian Prince; annexed to Greece during the First Balkan War
Eastern Rumelia (Doğu Rumeli), 1878–1885: established by the Treaty of Berlin on 13 July 1878 as an autonomous province; in a personal union with the tributary Principality of Bulgaria on 6 September 1885 but remained de jure under Ottoman suzerainty; annexed by Bulgaria on 5 October 1908.
Cyprus (Kıbrıs), 1878–1914: established as a British protectorate under Ottoman suzerainty with the Cyprus Convention of 4 June 1878; annexed by Britain on 5 November 1914, upon Ottoman entry into World War I.
Qatar (Katar), 1872–1913
Cretan State (Girit), 1898–1912/13: established as an internationally supervised tributary state headed by a Christian governor; in 1908 the Cretan parliament unilaterally declared union with Greece; the island was occupied by Greece in 1912, and de jure annexed in 1913

See also
List of Ottoman Empire territories

References